Sir Frederick Arthur Gore Ouseley, 2nd Baronet (12 August 18256 April 1889) was an English composer, organist, musicologist and priest.

Biography
Frederick Ouseley was born in London, the son of Sir Gore Ouseley, and manifested an extraordinary precocity in music, composing an opera (L'Isola disabitata) at the age of eight years. In 1844, having succeeded to the baronetcy, he entered at Christ Church, Oxford, and graduated BA in 1846 and MA in 1849. He was ordained in the latter year, and, as curate of St. Paul's Church, Knightsbridge, served the parish of St. Barnabas, Pimlico until 1851.

Throughout his life, Ouseley experienced a social conflict between his aristocratic heritage and his interest in the performance of Anglican church music, an activity which was seen as beneath someone of his stature. In 1850 he took the degree of Mus.B. at the University of Oxford, and four years afterwards that of Mus.D., his exercise being the oratorio The Martyrdom of St Polycarp. He was Heather Professor of Music at Oxford from 1855 to 1889. In 1856, Ouseley both founded and endowed with his own funds St Michael's College on the outskirts of Tenbury Wells, a choir school intended to serve as a model for Anglican church music.  He also became the school's first Warden.

Ouseley's works, which are little known today, include a second oratorio, Hagar (Hereford, 1873), a great number of services and anthems, psalm chants, cantatas, chamber music, organ pieces and songs. Among his instructional treaties on harmony, counterpoint, fugue, and composition are Harmony (1868) and Counterpoint (1869) and Musical Form (1875). He also added a series of chapters on English music to the English translation of Emil Naumann's History of Music, the subject having been practically ignored in the German treatise.

Death

Ouseley died in Hereford, where he had been precentor at Hereford Cathedral since 1855. Probably his most notable student was Sir John Stainer.

Works

Choral
[unfinished]
 Anthems:
All the kings of the earth
And there was a pure river of Water of life
And there was a war in heaven
Ascribe ye greatness
Awake, thou that sleepest
Behold, how good and joyful
Behold now, praise the Lord
Be merciful unto me
Blessed be the Lord God of Israel
Blessed be Thou
Blessed is he whose unrighteousness
Blessed is the man
Christ is risen from the dead
Except the Lord build the house
From the rising of the sun
Give thanks, O Israel
Great is the Lord
Happy is the man
Haste Thee, O God
How goodly are the tents
Is it nothing to you
It came even to pass
Jerusalem on high
O Saviour of the world
Oratorios
St Polycarp (1854)
Hagar (Hereford Festival, 1873)
Services
Evening Service in B flat
Evening Service in E flat
Miscellaneous
Gloria in D
Te Deum in D
Te Deum in F
Hymn tunes 
Contemplation (When all thy mercies, O my God)
Hereford (When wounded sore the stricken heart)
Bewdley (Children of the heavenly King)
St. Gabriel.

References

Attribution

External links
 
 
 St Michael's College Society
 The Ouseley Church Music Trust

1825 births
1889 deaths
19th-century English musicians
19th-century British composers
19th-century British male musicians
19th-century classical composers
Baronets in the Baronetage of the United Kingdom
English classical composers
English Romantic composers
English classical organists
British male organists
English music theorists
19th-century English Anglican priests
Heather Professors of Music
English male classical composers
Oratorio composers
Male classical organists
19th-century organists
19th-century musicologists